Zhang Ao (died 182BC) was one of the feudal lords after the end of the Qin dynasty in 206BC.

Life
Born in the Kingdom of Zhao, he was the son of Zhang Er (張耳), a Zhao general and participated in his father's campaigns against the last armies of the Qin. The hegemon king Xiang Yu of Western Chu made Zhang Er king of Changshan (常山王) during the Eighteen Kingdoms Period, but Zhang Er changed his loyalty to Liu Bang, the eventual founder of the Han dynasty and was titled as King of Zhao. In 202BC, Zhang Er died and Zhang Ao succeeded him to the throne of Zhao. He married Liu Bang's daughter, Princess Yuan of Lu (posthumous title). In 198BC, his plot to kill Liu Bang was revealed, but he was pardoned and only demoted to Marquis of Xuanping (宣平侯). He was succeeded as king of Zhao by the emperor's young son Liu Ruyi. Zhang Ao died during the reign of Empress Lü (r. 188–180BC).

Legacy
His posthumous title was Marquis Wu (武侯), but he was also venerated as King Yuan of Lu (魯元王). Zhang Ao's daughter Zhang Yan became the wife of Emperor Hui (r. 195–188BC), her uncle.

Sources
 Cang Xiuliang (1991). 《史記辭典》 [Shiji Cidian], Jinan: Shandong Jiaoyu Chubanshe, p. 503. 
 Cang Xiuliang (1996). 《漢書辭典》 [Hanshu Cidian], Jinan: Shandong Jiaoyu Chubanshe, p. 679. 

182 deaths
Year of birth unknown
Qin dynasty people